Sailing He from the KTH Royal Institute of Technology, Stockholm, Sweden was named Fellow of the Institute of Electrical and Electronics Engineers (IEEE) in 2013 for contributions to subwavelength photonics.

References

Fellow Members of the IEEE
Academic staff of the KTH Royal Institute of Technology
Swedish engineers
Living people
Year of birth missing (living people)
Place of birth missing (living people)